The fourth season of iCarly began airing on Nickelodeon July 30, 2010, and ended on June 11, 2011. The season features Carly Shay (Miranda Cosgrove), Sam Puckett (Jennette McCurdy) and Freddie Benson (Nathan Kress) as their own Web Show iCarly is becoming more popular worldwide. Jerry Trainor co-stars as Carly's big brother Spencer. Noah Munck joins the main cast this season as Gibby Gibson. The specials of the season include "iGot a Hot Room", "iSam's Mom", "iDo", "iStart a Fan War", "iOMG", and "iParty with Victorious".

Cast

Main

 Miranda Cosgrove as Carly Shay
 Jennette McCurdy as Sam Puckett
 Nathan Kress as Freddie Benson
 Jerry Trainor as Spencer Shay
 Noah Munck as Gibby Gibson

Recurring

 Mary Scheer as Marissa Benson
BooG!e as T-Bo
Ethan Munck as Guppy Gibson
 Reed Alexander as Nevel Papperman
 Greg Mullavy as Grandad Shay
 Tim Russ as Principal Franklin
David St. James as Mr. Howard

Guest stars
 Jane Lynch as Pam Puckett ("iSam's Mom")
 Irina Voronina as Krustacia ("iSell Penny Tees")
 J. D. Walsh as Gordon Birch ("iDo")
 Jack Black as Aspartamay ("iStart a Fan War")
 Max Ehrich as Adam ("iStart a Fan War")
 Abby Wilde as Stacey Dillsen ("iStart a Fan War" and "iHire an Idiot")
 Alec Medlock as Craig Ramirez ("iStart a Fan War")
 Scott Halberstadt as Eric Blonowitz ("iStart a Fan War")
 Jake Farrow as Gavin ("iStart a Fan War")
 Daniel Booko as Cort ("iHire an Idiot")
 Teresa Castillo as Ashley ("iHire an Idiot")
 Victoria Justice as Tori Vega ("iParty with Victorious")
 Leon Thomas III as Andre Harris ("iParty with Victorious")
 Matt Bennett as Robbie Shapiro ("iParty with Victorious")
 Elizabeth Gillies as Jade West ("iParty with Victorious")
 Ariana Grande as Cat Valentine ("iParty with Victorious")
 Avan Jogia as Beck Oliver ("iParty with Victorious")
 Daniella Monet as Trina Vega ("iParty with Victorious")
 Kenan Thompson as himself ("iParty with Victorious")
 Michael Eric Reid as Sinjin Van Cleef ("iParty with Victorious")
 Eric Lange as Sikowitz ("iParty with Victorious")
 Lane Napper as Lane ("iParty with Victorious")
Caitlin Carmichael as Molly ("iPity the Nevel")

Season synopsis
Starting from this season onwards, Gibby begins to hang out more often with Carly, Sam and Freddie than in the past three seasons.

In November of this season, the iCarly crew accidentally starts a fan war at WebiCon over who should date, Carly and Freddie (Creddie), or Sam and Freddie (Seddie). Despite the three confirming that none of them are dating, the fan war still seemingly remains unresolved. However, five months later, the three complete their two-month search for an intern for iCarly, at which point Sam — much to Carly's and Freddie's confusion and suspiciousness — begins hanging out with Freddie and Brad, the new intern, every time she gets the chance to. When Freddie tests his selfmade "MoodFace" app on Sam, it confirms that she is actually in love. Thinking that Sam still hates Freddie, he and Carly misunderstand the results, believing that Sam is in love with Brad, and Carly takes great steps into proving this. Sam still tries to convince her that she is not in love with him though. Freddie later finds Sam in the school yard and gives her a heart-to-heart talk about opening up and taking a risk when it comes to romantic feelings, not realizing that he is actually referring to himself. In the middle of the talk, Sam grabs Freddie and kisses him passionately, revealing that in fact he is the one she is in love with, as a shocked Carly watches through the window.

Episodes

 Noah Munck is promoted to the main cast.

References

2010 American television seasons
2011 American television seasons
4